The Empire State Marathon is an annual marathon  held each October in Syracuse, New York.  The first running of the race was on October 16, 2011.  The marathon course has been certified by the USATF.  As of spring 2021, the Empire State Marathon was purchased by Kelleigh's Cause, a 501(c)(3) charity dedicated to raising funds for medical research and awareness for the rare disease Arteriovenous Malformations, with the intention of becoming a charity fundraising race. It is now known as the Great New York State Marathon. It consists of a weekend of races (5k, 10k, half marathon, and full marathon) that starts at the New York State Fairgrounds and loops around Onondaga Lake.

Winners

References

External links

Syracuse.com Event Announcement 11/2/2010

Marathons in the United States
Sports in Syracuse, New York
Road running competitions in the United States
Recurring sporting events established in 2011
2011 establishments in New York (state)
Events in Syracuse, New York